Manakawad is a village in Dharwad district of Karnataka, India.

Demographics 
As of the 2011 Census of India there were 457 households in Manakawad and a total population of 2,191 consisting of 1,107 males and 1,084 females. There were 233 children ages 0-6.
Manakawad is a large village located in Navalgund Taluka of Dharwad district, Karnataka with total 457 families residing. The Manakawad village has population of 2191 of which 1107 are males while 1084 are females as per Population Census 2011.

In Manakawad village population of children with age 0-6 is 233 which makes up 10.63 % of total population of village. Average Sex Ratio of Manakawad village is 979 which is higher than Karnataka state average of 973. Child Sex Ratio for the Manakawad as per census is 849, lower than Karnataka average of 948.

Manakawad village has lower literacy rate compared to Karnataka. In 2011, literacy rate of Manakawad village was 72.83 % compared to 75.36 % of Karnataka. In Manakawad Male literacy stands at 84.81 % while female literacy rate was 60.80 %.

As per constitution of India and Panchyati Raaj Act, Manakawad village is administrated by Sarpanch (Head of Village) who is elected representative of village. Our website, don't have information about schools and hospital in Manakawad village.
Manakawad Data
Particulars	Total	Male	Female
Total No. of Houses	457	-	-
Population	2,191	1,107	1,084
Child (0-6)	233	126	107
Schedule Caste	143	65	78
Schedule Tribe	40	18	22
Literacy	72.83 %	84.81 %	60.80 %
Total Workers	1,301	684	617
Main Worker	1,269	-	-
Marginal Worker	32	16	16

 
Caste Factor
Schedule Caste (SC) constitutes 6.53 % while Schedule Tribe (ST) were 1.83 % of total population in Manakawad village.
n Manakawad village out of total population, 1301 were engaged in work activities. 97.54 % of workers describe their work as Main Work (Employment or Earning more than 6 Months) while 2.46 % were involved in Marginal activity providing livelihood for less than 6 months. Of 1301 workers engaged in Main Work, 768 were cultivators (owner or co-owner) while 401 were Agricultural labourer.

https://www.landrecords.karnataka.gov.in/service3/FileDownload.aspx?file=%5c%5cbhm-db-pp05%5cDistrict%5cMapshared%5c6011.pdf

References

Villages in Dharwad district